Engamma Maharani is a 1981 Indian Tamil-language film directed by M.A.Kaja starring Delhi Ganesh, Sumithra, Roopa and Y. Vijaya.

The film won the 1981 Tamil Nadu State Film Award for Best Lyricist for Pulamaipithan and remain as one of the rare films of Ganesh where he played the hero.

Plot

A happy family Delhi Ganesh, Sumithra and their three daughters gets affected by the arrival of a model (Y.Vijaya), who gets intimate with Delhi Ganesh.

Cast

Delhi Ganesh
Sumithra
Roopa
Vijay Babu
Suruli Rajan
Nalinikanth
Ragini
Y. Vijaya

Soundtrack
Soundtrack was composed by Shankar Ganesh and lyrics written by Pulamaipithan & M.A.Kaja.
Maalaiyil Pootha - S. P. Balasubramaniam, Vani Jairam
Annam Pola - Vani Jairam
Ethanai Kuzhandhai - S. P. Sailaja, Uma Ramanan, Krishnamoorthy

References

External links
 

1981 films
1980s Tamil-language films
Films scored by Shankar–Ganesh